Francisca Nazareth (born 17 November 2002), also known as Kika Nazareth, is a Portuguese professional footballer who plays as a forward for Benfica and the Portugal national team.

Club career
Francisca Nazareth made her senior debut for Benfica at the age of 16 and signed her first professional contract with the club on 7 October 2020, at the age of 17.

International career
Francisca Nazareth made her debut for the Portugal national team on 4 March 2020, coming on as a substitute for Carolina Mendes against Italy in the 2020 Algarve Cup. She scored her first goals for the Portugal national team on 22 june 2022 in a friendly match against Greece, scoring two goals in the first half in a 4-0 win for Portugal.

International goals

Honours
Benfica
 Campeonato Nacional Feminino: 2020–21, 2021–22
 Campeonato Nacional II Divisão Feminino: 2018–19
 Taça da Liga: 2019–20, 2020–21
 Supertaça de Portugal: 2022

References

2002 births
Living people
Women's association football forwards
Portuguese women's footballers
Portugal women's international footballers
Footballers from Lisbon
S.L. Benfica (women) footballers
Campeonato Nacional de Futebol Feminino players
UEFA Women's Euro 2022 players